Onsŏng County is a county (kun) in North Hamgyong Province, North Korea, located near the border with China.  The administrative center is the town (ŭp) of Onsong.  Onsong is the alleged site of the former Onsong concentration camp, now closed.

History
Onsong was one of the six post/garrisons established under the order of Sejong the Great of Joseon (1418–1450) to safeguard his people from the hostile Chinese Ming dynasty and Manchurian/Jurchen nomads living in Manchuria.

Geography
Onsong lies along the Tumen River, which forms the border with China.  To the north of Onsong is Jilin Province, China.  Onsong also contains the northernmost point in Korea, at 43°0'39″ N. Liangshui, in Tumen prefecture, is the closest Chinese town across the river.

The land of Onsong is mainly mountainous, although a part is flatland. It has a continental climate, and is the region of Korea with the longest winter, except the Kaema Plateau.  The highest peak is Yŏndubong.

Economy
Being mountainous in nature, Onsong is not well suited to agriculture. Ironically, however, it has the highest ratio of rice paddies to dry fields of any district in North Hamgyong Province.  Logging is prevalent in the Tumen River basin.  Lignite coal is also produced.

Transportation
Onsong is served by roads and railroads. In winter, it is also possible to cross the frozen Tumen River into China.

Onsong has a 4 km long, single overhead bidirectional trolleybus line linking from the railway station to the Wangjaesan Grand Monument, although no trolleybuses are observed on the line since at least 2004. The overhead is nonetheless at least appearing to be in a good condition. The system formerly had two Jipsan 88 trolleybuses, though they were converted from the similar, but unrelated Jipsan 88 bus.

Administrative divisions
Onsŏng County is divided into 1 town ("Ŭp"), 10 workers' districts ("Rodongjagu") and 15 villages ("Ri"):

Notable personalities
Yang Dae-su
Shin Rip, the prefect of Onsong, before the Imjin War
Jung You-ji
Choi Gwan
Go Gyung-jin
Hyok Kang, the author of the autobiographical This is Paradise!: My North Korean Childhood

References

External links

Location of the four forts and the six posts
Map of Onsong

 
Counties of North Hamgyong
China–North Korea border crossings